Lischkeia undosa is a species of sea snail, a marine gastropod mollusk in the family Eucyclidae.

Description
The size of the shell varies between 30 mm and 60 mm.

Distribution
This marine species occurs off the Philippines.

References

External links
 To Encyclopedia of Life
 To World Register of Marine Species
 

undosa
Gastropods described in 1956